Patricia A. Broderick (born November 30, 1949) is an Associate Judge on the Superior Court of the District of Columbia.

Education and career 
Broderick earned her Bachelor of Arts from Trinity College, her master's degree from George Washington University and her Juris Doctor from Columbus School of Law in 1981.

After graduating, she served as a law clerk for Henry F. Greene on the D.C. Superior Court.

D.C. Superior Court 
On February 11, 1997, President Bill Clinton nominated Broderick to a fifteen-year term as an associate judge on the Superior Court of the District of Columbia to the seat vacated by Harriett Rosen Taylor. On September 3, 1998, the Senate Committee on Governmental Affairs held a hearing on her nomination. On September 24, 1998, the Committee reported her nomination favorably to the senate floor. On October 28, 1998, the full Senate confirmed her nomination by voice vote.

On August 30, 2013, the Commission on Judicial Disabilities and Tenure recommended that President Obama reappoint her to second fifteen-year term as a judge on the D.C. Superior Court.

References

1949 births
Living people
21st-century American judges
21st-century American women judges
Columbus School of Law alumni
George Washington University alumni
Judges of the Superior Court of the District of Columbia
Trinity Washington University alumni